Kevin Friesenbichler (born 6 May 1994) is an Austrian professional footballer who plays as a forward for Polish club Lechia Gdańsk.

Club career
Born in Weiz, Friesenbichler joined local team SC Weiz at the age of five before joining Austrian giants FK Austria Wien in 2008. After a year he moved on to Admira Mödling and in 2010, he joined German heavyweight Bayern Munich. For the then 16-year-old Bayern even paid a transfer fee believed to be €500,000. He enjoyed a debut hat-trick for their U17 side and spent subsequently three years playing for their U19 squad, scoring 27 goals in 37 appearances. His impressive form lead him to be promoted to FC Bayern Munich II for the 2012–13 Regionalliga season. However, it was the 2013–14 season that he arrived at the scene, scoring 15 goals in 22 appearances as Bayern Munich II topped their table.

On 22 May 2014, Friesenbichler signed a four-year deal with Portuguese champions Benfica on a free transfer. On 26 July 2014, he scored his first goal for Benfica B on his debut in a friendly match win (4–3) against Ajax II.

On 22 August 2014, after not even two months at Benfica, Friesenbichler was loaned to Polish side Lechia Gdańsk on a season-long deal. According to his father he wouldn't have had many chances to play for Benfica and was therefore looking to pick up match practice. He made his professional debut on 31 August 2014 against Ruch Chorzów (3–3), also scoring his first goal in process.

On 22 July 2015, Friesenbichler was loaned to Austria Wien for one season. Exactly a year later, the loan was extended by a further season. On 1 July 2017, he signed a permanent deal with the Austrian club.

On 2 July 2019, Friesenbichler joined VfL Osnabrück on a two-year deal.

International career
On 14 August 2009, Friesenbichler made his debut for Austria U16 in an 8–0 victory over Liechtenstein U16, scoring 2 goals. He made his debut in competitive youth level international football on 18 November 2013 against Hungary in a 4–2 victory, in which he scored 1 goal.

Career statistics

1.Includes Regionalliga promotion playoffs and Ekstraklasa playoffs.

References

External links

 Kevin Friesenbichler at kicker.de
 
 
 
 

1994 births
Living people
Footballers from Styria
People from Weiz District
Austrian footballers
Austria youth international footballers
Austria under-21 international footballers
Association football forwards
FC Bayern Munich II players
S.L. Benfica footballers
Lechia Gdańsk players
Wolfsberger AC players
FK Austria Wien players
VfL Osnabrück players
SK Sturm Graz players
FK RFS players
Regionalliga players
Ekstraklasa players
III liga players
Austrian Football Bundesliga players
2. Bundesliga players
Latvian Higher League players
Austrian expatriate footballers
Expatriate footballers in Germany
Austrian expatriate sportspeople in Germany
Expatriate footballers in Portugal
Austrian expatriate sportspeople in Portugal
Expatriate footballers in Poland
Austrian expatriate sportspeople in Poland
Expatriate footballers in Latvia
Austrian expatriate sportspeople in Latvia